Air Marshal Ioannis Patsantaras (born 1954) is a retired Hellenic Air Force officer who served as commander of the Hellenic Tactical Air Force Command. He has served as mayor of Distomo-Arachova-Antikyra from 2011 to 2014.

Biography
He was born in 1954 in Arachova, Boeotia. In September 1973 he entered the Hellenic Air Force Academy, and graduated in June 1977. During his career, he served in various operational units of the Air Force. From 1995–1999, he served in the presidency of the Hellenic Republic (Military Office) as a aide-de-camp of President Konstantinos Stephanopoulos.

References

1954 births
Hellenic Air Force air marshals
Living people
People from Boeotia
Mayors of places in Greece